Thinoseius is a genus of mites in the family Eviphididae. There are about nine described species in Thinoseius.

Species
These nine species belong to the genus Thinoseius:
 Thinoseius acuminatus Evans, 1962
 Thinoseius berlesei Halbert, 1920
 Thinoseius fucicola (Halbert, 1920)
 Thinoseius hirschmanni
 Thinoseius kargi Hirschmann, 1966
 Thinoseius ramsayi Evans, 1969
 Thinoseius sawadai Takaku, 2000
 Thinoseius setifer Takaku, 2000
 Thinoseius spinosus (Willmann, 1939)

References

Mesostigmata
Articles created by Qbugbot